Anne Murray Archibald is a Canadian astronomer known for her observations of pulsars and as one of the developers of SciPy, a scientific programming library for the Python programming language. She is a senior lecturer in astronomy at Newcastle University in the UK.

Education and career
Archibald did her undergraduate studies in mathematics at the University of Waterloo, including internships involving computer graphics and the image analysis of radar data. After doing a master's degree in pure mathematics at McGill University, she became a doctoral student of astrophysicist Victoria Kaspi at McGill, and won both the Cecilia Payne-Gaposchkin Doctoral Dissertation Award in Astrophysics of the American Physical Society and the J.S. Plaskett Medal of the Canadian Astronomical Society for her 2013 doctoral dissertation, The End of Accretion: The X-ray Binary/Millisecond Pulsar Transition Object PSR J1023+0038.

After postdoctoral research at ASTRON and then at the Anton Pannekoek Institute for Astronomy, both in the Netherlands and supported by a Veni fellowship of the Netherlands Organisation for Scientific Research, she became a senior lecturer at Newcastle University in 2019.

References

External links
Home page

Year of birth missing (living people)
Living people
21st-century Canadian astronomers
Women astronomers
University of Waterloo alumni
McGill University Faculty of Science alumni
Academics of Newcastle University